Nitori Culture Hall (originally known as Hokkaido Kōsei Nenkin Kaikan) is an arts & concert venue, part of the Sapporo Geibunkan complex, located in Chūō-ku, Sapporo, Japan. It opened in 1971 as Hokkaido Kōsei Nenkin Kaikan; the complex includes a conference hall, a hotel and a concert hall.

The main concert hall has a seating capacity of 2,300. Since 2010, the furniture company Nitori owns the naming rights of the venue. Notable past performers include Santana, Cheap Trick, Whitesnake, King Crimson and Scorpions.

Access 
 Tozai Line: 4 minutes walk from Nishi-Jūitchōme Station.

References

Chūō-ku, Sapporo
Concert halls in Japan
Buildings and structures in Sapporo
Tourist attractions in Sapporo